Ligyra is a genus of bee flies in the Bombyliidae family. It was described by Edward Newman in 1841.  There are at least 110 described species in Ligyra.

See also
 List of Ligyra species

References

Bombyliidae
Bombyliidae genera
Taxa named by Edward Newman